Burnupena cincta, common name the ridged burnupena, is a species of sea snail, a marine gastropod mollusk in the family Buccinidae, the true whelks.

Subspecies
 Burnupena cincta cincta (Röding, 1798) (synonyms: Buccinum cinctum Röding, 1798 (basionym); Cominella cincta var. adjacens Turton, 1932; Cominella dunkeri Kobelt, 1878; Cominella semisulcata G.B. Sowerby III, 1892; Purpura ligata Lamarck, 1822)
 Burnupena cincta limbosa (Lamarck, 1822) (synonyms: Burnupena limbosa (Lamarck, 1822); Cominella porcata multilirata Bartsch, 1915; Purpura limbosa Lamarck, 1822 (basionym) )

References

 Steyn, D.G. & Lussi, M. (1998) Marine Shells of South Africa. An Illustrated Collector’s Guide to Beached Shells. Ekogilde Publishers, Hartebeespoort, South Africa, ii + 264 pp. page(s): 108
  Branch, G.M. et al. (2002). Two Oceans. 5th impression. David Philip, Cate Town & Johannesburg

Buccinidae
Gastropods described in 1798